Panagiotis Bachramis (12 March 1976, in Kalamata – 13 August 2010, in Kyparissia) was a Greek professional footballer who played as midfielder. On August 13, 2010, he was killed when a speedboat struck him while he was snorkeling near the beach in Kyparissia.

Career
Born in Kalamata, Bachramis began playing football with local side Apollon Kalamata in the Fourth Division.  He joined city rivals  Kalamata F.C. in 1994, the club he would play for seven seasons in the First and Second Division. In 1995, Bachramis made his debut in the first division at age 19, in a 5–0 victory over AEL.

In 2001, Bachramis signed with Iraklis Thessaloniki F.C. where he played until he joined AEL in 2004. He helped AEL to gain the promotion to the First Division and win the 2007 Greek Football Cup title. Bachramis also played in the 2007-08 UEFA Cup, where AEL bowed out against Blackburn Rovers F.C. He would finish his career with Veria F.C. in the Second Division, playing a total of more than 280 competitive League, Cup and European matches for his clubs.

Bachramis played with the Greece national under-21 football team, participating in the 1998 UEFA European Under-21 Football Championship qualifying rounds in 1997. Although the team qualified for the finals, he didn't manage to play because of an injury.
Although he suffered from frequent injuries, he was a valuable player for all the teams he played for, as he was fast, calm, collective, cooperative and could play in many positions in the pitch covering any gap. It is a characteristic that Bachramis had even played as a goalkeeper(!) in a match with AE Larissa. This happened on April 12, 2006, in the Alcazar Stadium, in the rematch for the semi-finals of the Greek Cup against Olympiacos. At 90', and while all three changes have been made, the regular goalkeeper Stefanos Kotsolis withdrew injured and Bachramis took his position under the goalpost.

Statistics
Points (as of 2009): 268 matches
First Division: 162
Second Division: 69
Greek Cup: 33
Greek Super Cup: 1
Intertoto: 1
UEFA Cup: 2

Goals (as of 2009): 29
First Division: 14
Beta Ethniki: 9
Greek Cup: 6

Clubs
{| class="wikitable"
! Years
! Clubs
! Points
! Goals
|-
|1993–94
| Apollon Kalamata
| (D)
|
|-
|1994–95
| Kalamata
|14 (B) + 2 (Cup)
|0
|-
|1995–96
| Kalamata
|18 (A) + 2 (Cup)
|1 (Α) + 1 (Cup)
|-
|1996–97
| Kalamata
|17 (A) + 2 (Cup)
|2 (A)
|-
|1997–98
| Kalamata
|19 (A)
|2 (A)
|-
|1998–99
| Kalamata
|22 (B'') + 4 (Cup)
|4 (B) + 2 (Cup)
|-
|1999–2000
| Kalamata
|16 (A) + 4 (Cup)
|2 (A) + 2 (Cup)
|-
|2000–01
| Kalamata
|17 (A) + 2 (Cup)
|4 (A)
|-
|2001–02
| Iraklis
|13 (A) + 6 (Cup)
|0
|-
|2002–03
| Iraklis
|14 (A)
|0
|-
|2003–04
| Iraklis
|5 (A) + 3 (Cup)
|0 (A) + 1 (Cup)
|-
|2004–05
| AEL
|21 (B) + 3 (Cup)
|4 (B)
|-
|2005–06
| AEL
|26 (A) + 4 (Cup)
|3 (A)
|-
|2006–07
| AEL
| 6 (A) + 0 (Cup) + 1 (I)
| 0
|-
|2007–08
| AEL
| 11 (A) + 2 (Cup) +1 (SC) + 2 (UEFA)
| 0
|-
|2008–09
| Veria
|12 (B) +1 (Cup)
|1 (B)
|-
|2009–10
| Veria
|9 (C)
|1 (C)
|-
! Years
! National teams
! Points
! Goals
|-
|()-1995
| U–19 team
|
|
|-
|1996–1997
| U–21 team
|2
|1
|}

Abbreviations:
 A or 1st: matches and goals in the First Division
 B or 2nd: matches and goals in the Second Division
 C or 3rd: matches and goals in the Third Division
 D or 4th: matches and goals in the Fourth Division
 Cup matches and goals in the Greek Cup
 SC matches and goals in the Super Cup
 I matches and goals in Intertoto

HonoursAEL'''
 Greek Cup: 2006–07

References

External links
youtube tribute video
newsbeast
eps messinias
eleftheria online

1976 births
2010 deaths
Greek footballers
Kalamata F.C. players
Iraklis Thessaloniki F.C. players
Athlitiki Enosi Larissa F.C. players
Veria F.C. players
Super League Greece players
Footballers from Kalamata
Accidental deaths in Greece
Association football midfielders